Mogh Mohammad (also Romanized as Mogh Moḩammad and Mogh-e Moḩammad) is a village in Qaleh Rural District, in the Central District of Manujan County, Kerman Province, Iran. At the 2006 census, its population was 127, in 32 families.

References 

Populated places in Manujan County